The 1952 All-American Girls Professional Baseball League season marked the tenth season of the circuit. The teams Battle Creek Belles, Fort Wayne Daisies, Grand Rapids Chicks, Kalamazoo Lassies, Rockford Peaches and South Bend Blue Sox competed through a 110-game schedule, while the Shaugnessy playoffs featured the top four teams from each half of the regular season.

In 1952 the league was left with six teams, as Kenosha and Peoria folded at the end of the previous season. No changes were made to the game, but attendance continued to decline. Joanne Weaver of Fort Wayne won  the batting crown with a .344 average, while her older sister and teammate Betty Foss was honored with the Player of the Year Award. Foss registered the second best average (.331) and led the league in total bases (209), runs scored (81), runs batted in (74), doubles (24) and triples (17). South Bend's Jean Faut won the pitching Triple Crown, after leading the league in earned run average (0.93) and strikeouts (114), while tying with Rockford's Rose Gacioch for the most victories (20). Faut also posted the best win–loss record (.909), that would eventually become the highest in league history. Furthermore, Marilyn Jones of Battle Creek hurled the only no-hitter of the season against Rockford on July 10.

During the best-of-three series, first place Fort Wayne lost to third place Rockford, two games to one, while second place South Bend swept fourth place Grand Rapids. Fort Wayne won the first game, 5–4, in a heroic 10-inning effort by Maxine Kline. But Rockford won the next contest, 4–3, with strong pitching from Rose Gacioch, who limited the powerful Daisies to a run after struggling in the first inning. In Game 3, Migdalia Pérez scattered six hits in a 6–0 shutout against Fort Wayne, while receiving offensive support from Jean Buckley, who went 4-for-4 with four RBI. In the other series, South Bend disposed of Grand Rapids in two games. Jean Faut struck out nine Chicks in a three-hit, 2–1 victory while facing Alma Ziegler in Game 1. Then, Glenna Sue Kidd defeated Earlene Risinger and Grand Rapids in Game 2, 6–1, to face Grand Rapids in the finals. South Bend clinched the title over the Peaches, 3 to 2 games. Once more Faut was brilliant in the final series, winning two games and batting an average of .300 (6-for-20) with two triples and three RBI, while leading the Blue Sox to their second championship in a row.

Attendance continued to decline, but no figures are available. For the second consecutive year Battle Creek failed to capture a sustainable fan base. The team would be relocated and renamed Muskegon Belles for the next season.

Standings

Postseason

Batting statistics

Pitching statistics

All-Star Game

See also
1952 Major League Baseball season
1952 Nippon Professional Baseball season

Sources

External links
AAGPBL Official Website
AAGPBL Records
Baseball Historian files
The Diamond Angle profiles and interviews
SABR Projects – Jim Sargent articles
YouTube videos

All-American Girls Professional Baseball League seasons
1950s in women's baseball
1952 in baseball
All